This article is a list of diseases of peaches and nectarines (Peach: Prunus persica; Nectarine: P. persica var. nucipersica).

Bacterial diseases

Fungal diseases

Nematodes, parasitic

Viral and viroid diseases

(Also uncharacterized graft-transmissible pathogens [GTP])

Phytoplasma diseases

Miscellaneous diseases and disorders diseases

References 

Common Names of Diseases, The American Phytopathological Society

Peach
 Peach
Peaches